The Great Britain women's national handball team is the national team of Great Britain in the sport of team handball. They were formed to take up Great Britain's host nation place in the 2012 Summer Olympics.

Matches

 Source: British Handball

The 2012 Olympic Squad

References

See also
Great Britain men's national handball team
Handball at the 2012 Summer Olympics

Women's national handball teams
National team
Handball